The Korea Institute of Maritime and Fisheries Technology, or KIMFT,  is a maritime education and research institute operated by the government of South Korea.  It is based in Yeongdang-dong, Nam-gu, Busan, with an auxiliary campus on Yeongdo island near Busan Port.  Each campus includes a dormitory for trainees.

The Institute was formed in 1998 from the merger of the Korea Fishing Training Center with the Korea Maritime Training and Research Institute.  The first was established in 1965 as the Korea Deep-sea Training Institute.  In 1978, it became an independent corporation.  The research institute was founded in 1983, attached to Korea Maritime and Ocean University.  The two were merged by an act of the National Assembly of South Korea passed in 1997.

In addition to its research work, KIMFT offers a range of professional certifications.  These include a certification in fish medicine.

See also
Fishing industry of South Korea
Government of South Korea
Education in South Korea

External links
Official site, in Korean and English

Government agencies of South Korea
Organizations based in Busan
Fishing in South Korea
Fisheries and aquaculture research institutes